Henry William Macrosty (1865 – 19 January 1941) was President of the Royal Statistical Society between 1940–41.

Macrosty was active in the Fabian Society for many years, writing a proposed bill creating an eight-hour working day in 1893, "The Revival of Agriculture: a proposed policy for Great Britain" in 1905, and several other tracts for the society.  From 1895 until 1906, he served on the society's executive.

Works

References

1865 births
1941 deaths
British statisticians
Members of the Fabian Society
Presidents of the Royal Statistical Society